Gibberula norvisae is a species of sea snail, a marine gastropod mollusk, in the family Cystiscidae.

Distribution
This species occurs in Cuba.

References

norvisae
Gastropods described in 2014